Nicola Bombacci (24 October 1879 – 28 April 1945) was an Italian Marxist revolutionary and later a fascist politician. He began in the Italian Socialist Party as an opponent of the reformist wing and became a founding member of the Communist Party of Italy in 1921, sitting on the fifteen-man Central Committee. During the latter part of his life, particularly during the Second World War, Bombacci allied with Benito Mussolini and the Italian Social Republic against the Allied invasion of Italy. He met his death after being shot by communist partisans and his body was subsequently strung up in Piazzale Loreto.

Biography

Italian Socialist Party
Nicola Bombacci was born near Forlì on 24 October 1879. During his adolescence he joined the Italian Socialist Party (PSI), of which he became suddenly a national leader at the head of the revolutionary wing, known as Massimalisti; other notable members of this far-left wing were Benito Mussolini, who also hailed from the countryside surrounding Forli, and Costantino Lazzari. In 1919 Bombacci became the Secretary of the PSI and in the general election in the same year he led the socialists to their best result ever; the PSI won the election with 32.3% of the vote and became the first party by votes and seats. The following year, Bombacci resigned as Secretary of the PSI, due to some tensions with the right-wing of the party led by Filippo Turati.

Italian Communist Party

In 1921 Bombacci became one of the founding fathers of the Communist Party of Italy (PCdI). Despite this, due to his days in the PSI as a fellow Massimalista, he remained a friend of Mussolini even after the latter had eschewed socialism in favour of fascism. Bombacci was eventually expelled from the PCdI in 1927 for embracing a pro-fascist position. From that year onwards, he became an open fascist, although he never officially joined the National Fascist Party. In the La Verità journal in 1936, Bombacci confessed "his adhesion to Fascism but also to Communism", writing: "Fascism has made grandiose Social Revolution, Mussolini and Lenin, Soviet and Fascist corporate state, Rome and Moscow. Several stands already taken had to be rectified, we have nothing of which to ask pardon for as both in present and past we are impelled by the same ideal: the triumph of work." By the beginning of the 1940s, Bombacci had officially distanced himself from communism by publishing pamphlets warning the Italian population on the dangers of Bolshevism and how Stalinism had degenerated socialist values.

Italian Social Republic
After Mussolini was ousted as Prime Minister of the Kingdom of Italy in 1943, Bombacci remained loyal to Mussolini and tried to help him legitimize the Italian Social Republic and relegitimize Italian fascism. He was the author of the economic theory of fascist socialization, prepared for the 1943 Congress of Verona. Nicknamed "the Red Pope" by the bourgeoisie, Bombacci told a crowd in Genoa in 1945 that "Stalin will never make socialism; rather Mussolini will." The project of socialization overseen by Bombacci was viewed with suspicion and boycotted by the occupying Nazi German forces; it was also unpopular among the Italian proletariat, who responded with huge strikes.

Death

Bombacci was shot on 28 April 1945 at Dongo (province of Como) where he had been captured, along with Mussolini, by Italian communist partisans. He was summarily shot alongside Mussolini. Before his execution, Bombacci shouted out "Long live Mussolini! Long live socialism!" After his death, he was hanged upside down at Piazzale Loreto in a public display, along with Mussolini, Clara Petacci, the secretary of the Republican Fascist Party, Alessandro Pavolini, Achille Starace and others. Above the body of Bombacci, there was a handwritten sign that read "Supertraditore" (Super-Traitor).

Four days after his death, his old friend and comrade Victor Serge read of the event in a newspaper in Mexico, where he was living in exile, and wrote several pages in his journal concerning him.  Engaging in what he called "practical psychology", Serge tried to imagine how a former communist could become a fascist:  "Among some Italians, particularly among the ex-Marxists and ex-syndicalists, two visions became apparent: that with the liberal democracies exhausted and socialism weakened, the corporatist regimes were going to impose their new formulas; and that through this narrow gate would pass collectivism, the precondition for a socialism different from that desired by the nineteenth century, ... corresponding better to man's basic nature."

See also
 Italo-Soviet Pact
 Jacques Doriot

References

External links

In a time of duplicity by Victor Serge

1879 births
1945 deaths
People from Civitella di Romagna
Italian Socialist Party politicians
Italian Communist Party politicians
People of the Italian Social Republic
People executed by Italy by firing squad
Executed Italian people
Former Marxists